Inge Paul (born 19 September 1946) is a German former competitive figure skater who represented West Germany. She is the 1962 and 1964 national champion. Her best ISU Championship placement, 7th, came at the 1963 World Championships in Cortina d'Ampezzo and at the 1964 European Championships in Grenoble. At the 1964 Winter Olympics in Innsbruck, she placed 17th in compulsory figures, 12th in free skating, and 14th overall. She was a member of SC Riessersee.

Competitive highlights

References 

1946 births
Figure skaters at the 1964 Winter Olympics
German female single skaters
Living people
Sportspeople from Hamburg
Olympic figure skaters of the United Team of Germany